The 2015 TCR International Series Singapore round was the ninth round of the 2015 TCR International Series season as well as the second round of the 2015 TCR Asia Series season. It took place on 19–20 September at the Marina Bay Street Circuit.

Kevin Gleason won the first race, starting from third position, driving a Honda Civic Type R TCR (FK2), and Jordi Gené gained the second one, driving a SEAT León Cup Racer.

Success Ballast
Due to the results obtained in the previous round and in the Sepang round of the TCR Asia Series, Pepe Oriola and Philippe Descombes received +30 kg, Stefano Comini and Eric Kwong +20 kg and Jordi Gené and Michael Choi +10 kg. Nevertheless, Descombes and Kwong didn't take part at this event, so they will take the ballast at the first round they will participate.

Classification

Qualifying

Notes:
 — Kenneth Ma, Mak Hing Tak and Luca Rangoni were moved to the back of the grid for having not set a time within the 107% limit.

Race 1

Notes:
 — Samson Chan was given a five-place grid penalty for causing a collision with Filipe de Souza in the Sepang round of the TCR Asia Series.

Race 2

Notes:
 — Rafaël Galiana and Kenneth Lau were given a 10-second penalty for jumping the start.
 — George Chou and Filipe de Souza were moved to the back of the grid because of a parc fermé infringement.

Standings after the event

Drivers' Championship standings

Teams' Championship standings

 Note: Only the top five positions are included for both sets of drivers' standings.

References

External links
TCR International Series official website

Singapore
TCR International Series